Jack Teanby (born 14 May 1996) is a Scotland international rugby league footballer who plays as a prop for the York Knights in the Betfred Championship. 

He previously played for the Dewsbury Rams in the Championship.

Background
Teanby was born in Leeds, West Yorkshire, England.

Career
In October 2018 he signed a one-year deal to join the York City Knights.

References

External links

Dewsbury Rams profile
Scotland profile
Scotland RL profile

1996 births
Living people
English rugby league players
Dewsbury Rams players
Hemel Stags players
Rugby league players from Leeds
Rugby league props
Scotland national rugby league team players
York City Knights players